Capitol Crossing is a $1.3 billion real estate development often also referred to as a community revitalization project in downtown Washington, D.C. Construction on the project began in 2014 and was completed in 2021.

The Capitol Crossing project is privately funded, and is one of the largest ongoing private developments in DC. This 2.2 million square foot project covers a 7-acre site above I-395 and consists of 5 mixed use buildings: 200 Massachusetts, 250 Massachusetts, 200 F Street, 600 Second, and 201 F Street. These five multi-use buildings will span three long blocks over the highway. The project is expected to have 75,000 square feet of retail, restaurants, and cafes, and below the project will be a 4-level garage with 1,146 parking spaces and 440 bicycle parking spaces. As a major infrastructure project, Capitol Crossing is expected to bring 8,000 permanent jobs as well as contribute over 40-million-dollar tax per year once established.

Developers of Capitol Crossing have claimed the project will create a greener, more sustainable city with Washington D.C.’s first “eco-district.” The five buildings are expected to be LEED  Platinum certified and the finished site will feature cogeneration power, rainwater catchment, and eco-chimney filtration.  The three blocks being built do not take land from Virginia or Maryland, but bring back land that was taken years ago.

The neighborhoods of Capitol Hill and the East End, which have been long divided by the highway, will be reconnected in the near future due to the construction of a platform adjacent to Massachusetts Avenue. According to city officials, this $200 million platform built over the highway will enhance the vibrancy of east downtown community of Washington, D.C.

According to Office of the Deputy Mayor for Planning and Economic Development, the development project will provide 150 residential units, and over one third of them are affordable to most of the median income.

The project is owned and developed by Property Group Partners, with Skidmore, Owings & Merrill serving as master planners.  The team also includes Roche-Dinkeloo as architect for the North Block (200/250 Massachusetts Ave) and Kohn Pedersen Fox Associates as architect for the South Block. Property Group Partners is the leasing agent.

References

Buildings and structures in Washington, D.C.